This is the list of the fields of doctoral studies in the United States used for the annual Survey of Earned Doctorates, conducted by NORC at the University of Chicago for the National Science Foundation and other federal agencies, as used for the 2015 survey.

These are fields of research-oriented doctoral studies, leading mostly to Ph.D.s – in the academic year 2014–15, 98% of the 55,006 research doctorates awarded in the U.S. were Ph.D.s; 1.1% were Ed.D.s; 0.9% were other research doctorates. Professional degrees, though they are also considered doctorates (earned, not honorary), and do entitle the holder to call themselves "Doctor", such as D.D.S., D.Min., M.D., D.Pharm., D.V.M, J.D., Psy.D., and Th.D., are not included in the survey.

Life sciences

Agricultural sciences/natural resources

000 Agricultural Economics
003 Natural Resource/Environmental Economics (also in social sciences)
010 Animal Nutrition
014 Animal Science, Poultry (or Avian)
019 Animal Science, Other
020 Agronomy and Crop Science
025 Agricultural and Horticultural Plant Breeding
030 Plant Pathology/Phytopathology (also in biological/biomedical sciences)
039 Plant Sciences, Other
043 Food Science
044 Food Science and Technology, Other
046 Soil Chemistry/Microbiology
049 Soil Sciences, Other
050 Horticulture Science
055 Fishing and Fisheries Sciences/Management
066 Forest Sciences and Biology
070 Forest/Resources Management
072 Wood Science and Pulp/Paper Technology
074 Natural Resources/Conservation
079 Forestry and Related Science, Other
080 Wildlife/Range Management
081 Environmental Science
098 Agricultural Sciences/Natural Resources, General
099 Agricultural Sciences/Natural Resources, Other

Biological/biomedical sciences

100 Biochemistry (see also #539)
102 Bioinformatics
103 Biomedical Sciences
104 Computational Biology
105 Biophysics (also in physics)
107 Biotechnology
110 Bacteriology
115 Plant Genetics
120 Plant Pathology/Phytopathology (also in agricultural sciences)
125 Plant Physiology
129 Botany/Plant Biology
130 Anatomy
133 Biometrics and Biostatistics
134 Epidemiology
136 Cell/Cellular Biology and Histology
137 Evolutionary Biology
139 Ecology
142 Developmental Biology/Embryology
145 Endocrinology
148 Entomology
151 Immunology
152 Marine Biology and Biological Oceanography
154 Molecular Biology
155 Structural Biology
157 Microbiology
158 Cancer Biology
160 Neuroscience
163 Nutrition science
166 Parasitology
167 Environmental Toxicology
168 Virology
169 Toxicology
170 Genetics/Genomics, Human and Animal
175 Pathology, Human and Animal
180 Pharmacology, Human and Animal 
185 Physiology, Human and Animal 
188 Wildlife Biology
189 Zoology 
198 Biology/Biomedical Sciences, General
199 Biology/Biomedical Sciences, Other

Health sciences

200 Speech-Language Pathology and Audiology
207 Oral Biology/Oral Pathology
210 Environmental Health
212 Health Systems/Service Administration
215 Public Health
217 Health Policy Analysis
222 Kinesiology/Exercise Science
227 Gerontology (also in social sciences)
230 Nursing Science
240 Pharmaceutical Sciences
245 Rehabilitation/Therapeutic Services
250 Veterinary Sciences
280 Health and Behavior
298 Health Sciences, General
299 Health Sciences, Other

Engineering

300 Aerospace, Aeronautical & Astronautical Engineering
303 Agricultural Engineering
306 Bioengineering and Biomedical Engineering
312 Chemical Engineering
315 Civil Engineering
316 Structural Engineering 
318 Communications Engineering
321 Computer Engineering
324 Electrical, Electronics and Communications Engineering
327 Engineering Mechanics
330 Engineering Physics
333 Engineering Science
336 Environmental/Environmental Health Engineering
337 Geotechnical and Geoenvironmental Engineering
339 Industrial and Manufacturing Engineering
342 Materials Science
345 Mechanical Engineering
348 Metallurgical Engineering
357 Nuclear Engineering
360 Ocean Engineering
363 Operations Research (also in mathematics and in business management)
366 Petroleum Engineering
369 Polymer & Plastics Engineering
372 Systems Engineering
373 Transportation and Highway Engineering
376 Engineering Management and Administration
398 Engineering, General
399 Engineering, Other

Computer and information sciences

400 Computer Science
410 Information Science and Systems
415 Robotics
418 Computer and Information sciences, General
419 Computer and Information sciences, Other

Mathematics

420 Applied Mathematics
425 Algebra
430 Analysis & Functional Analysis
435 Geometry/Geometric Analysis
440 Logic
445 Number Theory
450 Statistics (also in social sciences)
455 Topology, Foundations
460 Computing Theory and Practice
465 Operations Research (also in engineering and in business management)
498 Mathematics/Statistics, General
499 Mathematics/Statistics, Other

Physical sciences

Astronomy

500 Astronomy
505 Astrophysics
509 Astronomy, Other
511 Astrobiology

Atmospheric science and meteorology

510 Atmospheric Chemistry and Climatology
512 Atmospheric Physics and Dynamics
514 Meteorology
518 Atmospheric Science/Meteorology, General
519 Atmospheric Science/Meteorology, Other

Chemistry

520 Analytical Chemistry
522 Inorganic Chemistry
526 Organic Chemistry
528 Medicinal Chemistry
530 Physical Chemistry
532 Polymer Chemistry
534 Theoretical Chemistry
538 Chemistry, General
539 Chemistry, Other (see also #100)

Geological and Earth sciences

540 Geology
542 Geochemistry
544 Geophysics & Seismology
546 Paleontology
548 Mineralogy & Petrology
550 Stratigraphy & Sedimentation
552 Geomorphology & Glacial Geology
558 Geological and Earth Sciences, General
559 Geological and Earth Sciences, Other

Physics

560 Acoustics
561 Atomic/Molecular/Chemical Physics
564 Particle (Elementary) physics
565 Biophysics (also in biological/biomedical sciences)
568 Nuclear Physics
569 Optics/Photonics
570 Plasma/Fusion Physics
572 Polymer Physics
574 Condensed Matter/Low Temperature Physics
576 Applied Physics
577 Medical Physics/Radiological Science
578 Physics, General
579 Physics, Other

Ocean/marine sciences

585 Hydrology & Water Resources
590 Oceanography, Chemical and Physical
595 Marine Sciences
599 Ocean/Marine Sciences, Other

Psychology

600 Clinical Psychology
602 Behavioral analysis
603 Cognitive Psychology & Psycholinguistics
609 Counseling
612 Developmental and Child Psychology
613 Human Development and Family Studies
614 Health and Medical Psychology
615 Experimental Psychology
618 Educational Psychology (also in education)
620 Family Psychology
621 Industrial and Organizational (See also #935)
622 Mental Health
624 Personality Psychology
627 Neuropsychology/Physiological Psychology
633 Psychometrics and Quantitative Psychology
636 School Psychology (also in education)
639 Social Psychology
648 Psychology, General
649 Psychology, Other

Social sciences

650 Anthropology, General
651 Gender and Women's Studies
652 Area/Ethnic/Cultural Studies
655 Anthropology, Cultural
656 Anthropology, Physical and Biological
657 Criminal Justice and Corrections
658 Criminology
662 Demography/Population studies
665 Natural Resource/Environmental Economics (also in agricultural sciences)
667 Economics
668 Econometrics
670 Geography
674 International Relations/Affairs
676 Linguistics
678 Political Science & Government
682 Public Policy Analysis
684 Gerontology (also in health sciences)
686 Sociology 
690 Statistics (also in mathematics)
694 Urban Affairs/Studies
695 Urban/City, Community and Regional Planning
698 Social Sciences, General
699 Social Sciences, Other

Humanities

History

700 American History (U.S. and Canada)
703 Asian History
705 European History
706 African History
707 Latin American History
708 Middle/Near East Studies 
710 History, Science and Technology and Society
718 History, General
719 History, Other

Letters

720 Classics
723 Comparative Literature
724 Folklore
732 American Literature (U.S. and Canada)
733 English Literature (British and Commonwealth)
734 English Language
735 Creative Writing
736 Speech and Rhetorical Studies
737 Rhetoric and Composition
738 Letters, General
739 Letters, Other

Foreign languages and literature

740 French
743 German
746 Italian
749 Spanish
750 Latin American
752 Russian
758 Chinese
762 Japanese
768 Arabic
769 Other Languages and Literature

Other humanities

770 American/U.S. Studies
773 Archaeology
776 Art History/Criticism/Conservation
777 Jewish/Judaic Studies and History
778 Film/Cinema/Video Studies
780 Music
785 Philosophy
786 Music Theory and Composition
787 Music Performance
790 Religion/Religious studies
792 Bible/Biblical Studies
795 Drama/Theater Arts
798 Humanities, General
799 Humanities, Other

Education

Research and administration
800 Curriculum & Instruction
804 Educational and Human Resource Studies/Development
805 Educational Administration and Supervision
806 Urban Education and Leadership
807 Educational Leadership
808 Educational Policy Analysis
810 Educational/Instructional Media Design
812 Educational/Instructional Technology
815 Educational Statistics/Research Methods
820 Educational Assessment/Testing/Measure
822 Educational Psychology (also in psychology)
825 School Psychology (also in psychology)
830 Social/Philosophical Foundations of Education
833 International Education
835 Special Education
840 Counseling Education/Counseling and Guidance
845 Higher Education/Evaluation and Research

Teacher education

850 Pre-elementary/Early Childhood Teacher Education
852 Elementary Teacher Education
856 Secondary Teacher Education
858 Adult and Continuing Teacher Education

Teaching fields

860 Agricultural Education
861 Art Education
863 English as a Second or Foreign Language
864 English Education
865 Bilingual and Multilingual Education
866 Foreign Languages Education
868 Health Education
870 Family and Consumer/Human Science (also in fields not elsewhere classified)
874 Mathematics Education
876 Music Education
878 Nursing Education
880 Physical Education and Coaching
882 Literacy and Reading Education
884 Science Education
885 Social Science Education
889 Teacher Education and Professional Development, Other

Other education

895 Workforce Education and Development
898 Education, General
899 Education, Other

Business management/administration

900 Accounting
901 Finance
910 Business Administration and Management
912 Hospitality, Food Service and Tourism Management
915 Business/Managerial Economics
916 International Business/Trade/Commerce
917 Management Information Systems/Business Statistics
920 Marketing Management and Research
921 Human Resources Development
930 Operations Research (also in engineering and in mathematics)
935 Organizational Behavior (see also #621)
938 Business Management/Administration, General
939 Business Management/Administration, Other

Communication

940 Communication research
947 Mass Communication/Media Studies
950 Film, Radio, TV, and Digital Communication
957 Communication Theory
958 Communication, General
959 Communication, Other

Fields not elsewhere classified

960 Architecture/Environmental Design
964 Family/Consumer Science/Human Science (also in education)
968 Law
972 Library Science
974 Parks/Sports/Rec./Leisure/Fitness
976 Public Administration
980 Social Work
981 Social entrepreneurship
984 Theology/Religious Education (see also #774, #790)
989 Other Fields, Not Elsewhere Classified

See also
 List of doctoral degrees in the US
 Joint Academic Coding System (UK classification)
 Australian and New Zealand Standard Research Classification 
 List of academic disciplines
 Fields of science

Notes

External links
  A Taxonomy of Doctoral Research Fields by the United States National Academies

Academic disciplines
 
Doctoral studies
Educational classification systems
Doctoral Studies